The Sasol Solar Challenge is a South African endurance challenge for solar-powered vehicles, with classes for hybrid vehicles, electric vehicles, and biofuel-powered vehicles as well. Recognised by the International Solarcar Federation, the first challenge was run in 2008, and every two years thereafter. The event covers roughly 2,500 km, but has set loops for teams to repeat, with the potential to do 5,000 km. The current record, held by Dutch team Nuon, is 4,716 km, set in 2016 in their car Nuna. The challenge route may change from year to year. In 2022, it ran from Carnival City near Johannesburg to Cape Town over the course of 8 days. The challenge has both local South African teams from both high schools and universities participate, as well as some top-ranking international teams from Japan (Tokai), Belgium (Innoptus Solar Team previously known as Agoria) and the Netherlands (Brunel Solar Team previously known as Vattenfall/Nuon).

Objective
The primary objective is to design, manage, build and race solar powered-vehicles across South Africa. The challenge sees a collaboration between pupils, students, private individuals and various industry and government partners, to work together to have a safe, technology-rich event. Moreover, the challenge is seen as an educational tool to focus on and communicate about science and technology to the broad public.

Results

2022 edition 
The Netherlands finished first, in a second place with +38km was Belgium and bronze went to Sunchaser, from South African university TUT.

See also

North American Solar Challenge
Race The Sun
World Solar Challenge
Hunt-Winston School Solar Car Challenge
 The Quiet Achiever, the world's first solar-powered racecar

External links

Official site

Solar car races
Science and technology in South Africa
Photovoltaics